Brachygobius mekongensis is a species of goby from the subfamily Gobionellinae which is found in the Mekong basin in southern Vietnam, Thailand, Cambodia (including Tonle Sap) and Laos where it lives in slow flowing waters and swamps among tangled roots and vegetation. This species is infrequently recorded in the aquarium trade and is potentially threatened by degradation of its habitat by drainage, water diversion and the building of dams and bridges.

References 

Fish of Thailand
mekongensis
Fish described in 2000
Taxa named by Helen K. Larson
Taxa named by Chavalit Vidthayanon